Kilmichael may refer to:
 Kilmichael, County Cork, Ireland
 Kilmichael Ambush, 1920
 Kilmichael, Mississippi, United States
 Kilmichael structure, geological feature and probable impact crater, near Kilmichael, Mississippi